Twister is a 1996 American epic disaster film directed by Jan de Bont from a screenplay by Michael Crichton and Anne-Marie Martin. It was produced by Crichton, Kathleen Kennedy, and Ian Bryce, with Steven Spielberg, Walter Parkes, Laurie MacDonald, and Gerald R. Molen serving as executive producers. The film stars an ensemble cast that includes Helen Hunt, Bill Paxton, Jami Gertz, Cary Elwes, Philip Seymour Hoffman, Alan Ruck, Todd Field, and Jeremy Davies as a group of amateur but spirited storm chasers trying to deploy a tornado research device during a severe outbreak in Oklahoma. Twister was officially released in theaters on May 10, 1996. It is notable for being the first film to be released on DVD in the United States.

Twister grossed $495 million worldwide and became the second-highest grossing film of 1996; it sold an estimated 54.7 million tickets in the United States. It received generally positive reviews from critics, as some praised the visual effects and sound design, but others criticized the screenplay. The film received Academy Award nominations for Best Visual Effects and Best Sound, but lost both to Independence Day and The English Patient respectively. A sequel, Twisters, is in production and is projected for a July 2024 release.

Plot 
On an Oklahoma farm in 1969, young Jo Thornton, her parents, and their dog, Toby, take shelter from a F5 tornado that ultimately destroys their farm and kills Jo's father. Twenty-seven years later, Jo is a tornado-obsessed meteorologist who leads a rag-tag team of storm chasers. Jo's estranged husband, Bill Harding, an ex-storm chaser turned TV weatherman, travels to Oklahoma with his fiancé, Melissa Reeves, a therapist, to ensure that Jo signs their divorce papers. Bill is excited that Jo has created "Dorothy", a capsule-like device containing hundreds of small weather sensors that he conceptualized, but never saw realized. Dorothy could revolutionize tornado research and potentially provide an earlier storm-warning system, but the device must be deployed dangerously close to a tornado to work. Jo's team rushes off to chase a developing storm, forcing Bill and Melissa to follow in Bill's new truck when Jo leaves with the unsigned papers.

Along the way, Bill encounters Jonas Miller, a rival storm chaser and former colleague with corporate funding who stole Bill's idea for a Dorothy-like device. Jonas plans to deploy his version first to receive sole credit. Enraged, Bill agrees to accompany Jo and the team for one day to successfully launch Dorothy. As the team pursues a developing F1 tornado, Jo's truck runs into a ditch. Jo and Bill hide under a bridge as the tornado destroys the vehicle, a tractor, a small footbridge, and one of the four Dorothy prototypes. With more storms developing, Bill leads the team in his truck, chasing an intensifying F2 tornado. They encounter Jonas's team just as Bill accurately predicts a sudden change in the tornado's path and diverts their course. While driving through water-filled fields, two waterspouts form, with one of them splitting into two, and they ambush and violently thrash the vehicle before dissipating. Bill and Jo are unscathed, though Melissa is traumatized.

The team visits Jo's Aunt Meg in nearby Wakita to eat. While there, Bill tells Melissa about Jo's childhood trauma. Meanwhile, Meg infers to her niece that Bill and Jo still love each other. The team then scrambles to chase a developing twister. Jo and Bill intercept a violent F3 tornado with highly unpredictable movements. It knocks over powerlines that crush Dorothy II. With the truck damaged, Bill forces them to retreat, but Jo undergoes an emotional break over the failure, and argues about her motivations, her past, and her father's death. Bill admits his feelings for Jo, unaware that Melissa is overhearing their entire conversation through the CB radio.

The team overnights in a small town to repair their vehicles. While there, Jo signs the divorce papers to assuage Bill's conflicted feelings. The surprise appearance of an F4 tornado forces the team and many other people into a garage for protection. The tornado obliterates a drive-in theater, destroys two team vehicles, and injures several people before proceeding directly toward Wakita and Aunt Meg. Before the team rush to Wakita, Melissa amicably ends her and Bill's relationship, encouraging him to reunite with Jo.

The tornado sirens provided little warning time, leaving Wakita in ruins and flattening Meg's house. The team rescues the slightly-injured Meg, who urges Jo to continue her research to improve warning systems. The National Severe Storms Laboratory forecasts a record-breaking F-5 will form the next day. Inspired by Meg's large wind-vane sculptures, Bill and Jo add aluminum "wings" to the last two Dorothy prototype sensors, making them more aerodynamic. The team pursues the mile-wide F5 tornado. An airborne tree destroys Dorothy III as they try launching it. Meanwhile, Jonas attempts to deploy his device, ignoring Bill and Jo's warnings that the tornado is headed straight at them. Jonas' truck is swept away, killing him and his assistant. With the last remaining Dorothy affixed to the truck bed, Bill and Jo drive directly at the tornado, then jump out, sacrificing Bill's truck. The last Dorothy is successfully deployed, providing immediate scientific data, but Jo and Bill are forced to run on foot as the tornado shifts toward them. Inside a nearby pumphouse, they strap themselves to deep pipes, getting a close view as the building rips away and the F5's core passes over them. After the tornado dissipates, the team celebrate their success and Jo and Bill reconcile.

Cast 

Richard Lineback and Rusty Schwimmer also appear at the beginning of the film as Mr. and Mrs. Thornton, Jo's parents. The opening scene in which Gary England appears via archival footage provided by KWTV, takes place in 1969, when England was an oceanographer for New Orleans-based A.H. Glenn and Associates; he was not hired by KWTV until October 1972. Additionally, the weather radio operator heard toward the beginning of the movie was voiced by Andy Wallace, then-chief meteorologist at ABC-affiliated television station KSWO-TV in Lawton.

Production

Development and writing
Twister was produced by Steven Spielberg's Amblin Entertainment, with financial backing from Warner Bros. Pictures and Universal Pictures. In return, Warner Bros. was given the North American distribution rights, while Universal's joint-venture distribution company, United International Pictures, obtained international distribution rights.

Spielberg himself was originally attached to direct the project, and directors such as James Cameron, John Badham, Tim Burton, and Robert Zemeckis were also in talks to helm the film before Jan de Bont signed on to Twister after leaving Godzilla due to creative differences. He recently had a huge hit with his first film, Speed, which was released in 1994. The Dutch filmmaker's resume as a director of photography had included Die Hard and The Hunt for Red October. Also, one of the main characters, Bill Harding, was set to be played by Tom Hanks, but he dropped out of the film and would later work on That Thing You Do! as writer and director, instead, saying, "an action movie wasn't what I wanted to do at that point in my career."  Meanwhile, Helen Hunt chose not to play Terry Carmichael in Broken Arrow, and instead played Jo Thornton-Harding after Laura Dern declined on playing that role.

Filming
The production was plagued with problems; Joss Whedon was brought in to rewrite the script through the early spring of 1995. When Whedon contracted bronchitis, Steven Zaillian was brought in to work on revisions. Whedon later returned and worked on revisions through the start of shooting in May 1995, then left the project after he got married. Two weeks into production, Jeff Nathanson was flown to the set and worked on the script until principal photography ended. After the Oklahoma City bombing occurred on April 19, 1995, filming of Twister was suspended while the cast and crew worked with relief efforts.

Filming was to originally take place in the United Kingdom and California, but De Bont insisted the film be shot on location in Oklahoma, because he felt that Twister could be "the last great action movie not shot on a soundstage". Shooting occurred all over the state; several scenes, including the opening scene where the characters meet each other, and the first tornado chase in the Jeep pickup, were filmed in Fairfax and Ralston, Oklahoma. The scene at the automotive repair shop was filmed in Maysville and Norman. The waterspout scenes were filmed on Kaw Lake near Kaw City. The drive-in scene was filmed at a real drive-in theater in Guthrie, though some of the scene, such as Melissa's hotel room, was filmed in Stillwater near the Oklahoma State University campus. The films played at the drive-in theater were The Shining and Psycho as part of the Night of Horrors combo.

The real town of Wakita – serving as the hometown of Lois Smith's character, Meg, in the film – was used during filming, and a section of the older part of town was demolished for the scene, showing the aftermath of the F4 tornado that devastates the town. This location was selected after scouts discovered leftover debris from a major hailstorm that occurred two years earlier in June 1993. Most of the residents signed up for extra materials and were paid $100 per day. Additional scenes and B-roll were filmed near Ponca City and Pauls Valley, among several other smaller farm towns across the state. However, due to changing seasons that massively transformed the look of Oklahoma's topography, filming was moved to Iowa. The climactic scene with the F5 tornado was almost entirely shot around Eldora, Iowa, with the cornfield the characters run through located near Ames.

Halfway through filming, both Bill Paxton and Helen Hunt were temporarily blinded by bright electronic lamps used to make the sky behind the two actors look dark and stormy. Paxton remembers that "these things literally sunburned our eyeballs. I got back to my room, I couldn't see".  To solve the problem, a Plexiglas filter was placed in front of the beams. The actors took eye drops and wore special glasses for a few days to recuperate. After filming in a particularly unsanitary ditch (for the first tornado chase scene, in which Bill and Jo are forced to shelter from an approaching F1 tornado under a short bridge), Hunt and Paxton needed hepatitis shots. During the same sequence, Hunt repeatedly hit her head on a low wooden bridge, so exhausted from the demanding shoot that she stood up so quickly her head struck a beam.  During one stunt in which Hunt opened the door of a vehicle speeding through a cornfield, she momentarily let go of the door and it struck her on the side of the head. Some sources claim she received a concussion in the incident. De Bont said, "I love Helen to death, but you know, she can be also a little bit clumsy". She responded, "Clumsy? The guy burned my retinas, but I'm clumsy ... I thought I was a good sport. I don't know ultimately if Jan chalks me up as that or not, but one would hope so".

Some crew members, feeling that De Bont was "out of control", left the production five weeks into filming.  The camera crew led by Don Burgess claimed De Bont "didn't know what he wanted till he saw it. He would shoot one direction, with all the equipment behind the view of the camera, and then he'd want to shoot in the other direction right away and we'd have to move [everything] and he'd get angry that we took too long ... and it was always everybody else's fault, never his".  De Bont claims that they had to schedule at least three scenes every day because the weather changed so often, and "Don had trouble adjusting to that".

When De Bont, in a fit of rage, knocked over a camera assistant who missed a cue, Burgess and his crew walked off the set, much to the shock of the cast. They remained in place for one more week until Jack N. Green's crew agreed to replace them. Two days before principal filming ended, Green was injured when a hydraulic house set (used in the scene in which Jo and Bill rescue Meg and her dog, Mose, from her tornado-destroyed home in Wakita), designed to collapse on cue, was mistakenly activated with him inside it. A rigged ceiling hit him in the head and injured his back, requiring him to be hospitalized. De Bont took over as his own director of photography for the remaining shots.

Because overcast skies were not always available, De Bont had to shoot many of the film's tornado-chasing scenes in bright sunlight, requiring Industrial Light & Magic to more than double its original plan for 150 "digital sky-replacement" shots. Principal photography was originally given a deadline to allow Hunt to return to film the fourth season of her NBC sitcom Mad About You, but when shooting ran over schedule, series creator and actor Paul Reiser agreed to delay the show's production for two-and-a-half weeks so Twister could finish filming. The tornadoes in the film were not real, but were instead computer-animated. To compose the sound effects of these twisters, De Bont had recorded a variety of combined sound effects, including lion roars, tiger growls, camel moans, and jet-engine wooshes. Other special effects that were animated with CGI included telephone poles, trees, trucks, tractors, and whole houses. The crew used a Boeing 707 airplane engine and smaller fans to generate wind throughout the film. The flying cow was perhaps the most famous scene throughout the film. The CGI cow was originally a CGI zebra from the 1995 film Jumanji. During the hailstorm scene after locating a particularly juicy storm cell on the radar, Beltzer says, "That's no moon, it's a space station!", which is a reference to Obi-Wan Kenobi's quote from the first Star Wars movie, A New Hope. Plus, the gasoline truck seen flying around the F5 tornado has the "Benthic Petroleum" label, bearing the same name of the company from The Abyss, James Cameron's 1989 20th Century Fox film.

Post production
De Bont claimed that Twister cost close to $70 million, of which $2–3 million went to the director. Last-minute reshoots in March and April 1996 (to clarify a scene about Jo as a child) and overtime requirements in post production and at ILM, are thought to have raised the budget to $90 million. During post production of Twister, Spielberg took over directing duties on Minority Report instead of The Haunting. The film was set to be released on May 17. Warner Bros. eventually made the decision to push forward Twisters release date to May 10 in order to avoid audience cannibalization with the release of Paramount's Mission: Impossible two weeks later. The premiere took place at the AMC Penn Square 10, then known as General Cinema Theatres at Penn Square Mall in Oklahoma City a day prior. Jan de Bont, Bill Paxton, and Helen Hunt were at the mall for interviews.

Soundtrack
Twister featured both a traditional orchestral film score by Mark Mancina, and a soundtrack of rock-music singles, many of which were exclusive releases for the film. Both the soundtrack and the orchestral score featured an instrumental theme song ("Respect the Wind") composed and performed for the film by Alex and Eddie Van Halen. The film's music was released on CD and cassette tape formats.

Twister: Music from the Motion Picture Soundtrack 

Also, some other music is used, such as Deep Purple's "Child in Time" (heard when the team takes the road at the beginning and the assistant maximizes the volume in his truck). It is later in the scene mixed and beat-synced with "William Tell Overture". The song queued up on a TV in Dusty's van is Eric Clapton's "Motherless Child".

Twister: Motion Picture Score 

Some orchestrated tracks were in the film, but were not released on the orchestral score, most notably the orchestrated introduction to "Humans Being" from when Jo's team left Wakita to chase the Hailstorm Hill tornado. Other, lesser-known tracks omitted include an extended version of "Going Green" (when first meeting Jonas) and a short track from when the first tornado is initially spotted.

Twister: Expanded Archival Collection 

In January 2017, La-La Land Records released a limited-edition, remastered, and expanded album containing Mark Mancina's entire score plus four additional tracks.

Reception

Box office 
Twister opened on May 10, 1996, earning $41.1 million from 2,414 total theaters during its opening weekend, and ranked in the number-one spot at the North American box office, taking the spot from The Craft. Upon its release, it topped The Birdcage to have the biggest 1996 opening. At that time, it had the sixth-largest opening weekend of any movie, behind The Lion King, Batman, Batman Returns, Jurassic Park, and Batman Forever. Moreover, the film had the largest May opening weekend, dethroning Lethal Weapon 3 and The Flintstones. The success of Twister helped the blockbusters of May officially begin the summer season. It would follow similar openings of Deep Impact in 1998 and The Mummy in 1999. Two years later in 2001, The Mummy Returns set a new precedent for the frame by unleashing an opening weekend of $68.1 million. Then in 2002, Spider-Man took the summer starter films to the next level with its $114.8 million opening weekend.

During its second weekend, Twister managed to top Flipper with an additional $38.5 million. The film suffered a 10% second-weekend drop, making it the smallest decline for a nonholiday film. For 15 years, Twister held that record until it was surpassed by DreamWorks' Puss in Boots in 2011. By May 21, it reached the $100-million mark. Not too long after, the number-one spot was taken by Mission: Impossible, putting Twister into second place. Like its predecessor, the film also had the largest May opening weekend. It went on to hold this record until 1997, when it was taken by The Lost World: Jurassic Park. As for Twister, it  continued to stay in second place while beating out Dragonheart. When The Rock was released that June, the film was put into third place. It then approached $200 million by June 19. Twister fell into fifth place shortly after the releases of The Hunchback of Notre Dame and Eraser. After Independence Day was released in July, the film crossed over Ghostbusters to become the 13th-highest domestic grossing film of all time. It continued to dominate the box office, especially during the Summer Olympics in Atlanta, Georgia.

After 12 weeks of release, the film had earned $231.3 million and had become 12th-highest domestic grosser, surpassing The Empire Strikes Back. Twister went on to earn a total of $241.7 million at the North American box office, and a worldwide total of $494.5 million during its theatrical run. It became the second-highest grossing film of 1996, behind Independence Day, and was the 10th-highest grossing film in history at the time of its release, making it the most successful Warner Bros. film release, surpassing Batman. In 2001, Harry Potter and the Sorcerer's Stone took Twisters record for becoming the highest-grossing Warner Bros. film of all time. This A-level disaster movie was right before Hollywood went all-in for a few years to offer the likes of Independence Day, Dante's Peak, Volcano, Titanic (which also starred Paxton), Deep Impact, Armageddon, The Core, The Day After Tomorrow, and War of the Worlds. As of 2020, Twister ranks at #76 among the highest-grossing North American movie releases of all-time; worldwide, it places #105 on the all-time earners list, not adjusted for inflation.

Critical response 
Twister received generally positive reviews, with many critics praising the jaw-dropping special effects that brought the storms to life. On Rotten Tomatoes, the film holds an approval rating of 63% "Fresh" based on 70 reviews, and an average rating of 6.1/10. The site's critics consensus read: "A high-concept blockbuster that emphasizes special effects over three-dimensional characters, Twisters visceral thrills are often offset by the film's generic plot." On Metacritic, the film had a weighted average score of 68 out of 100, based on 17 critics, indicating "generally favorable reviews". Audiences polled by CinemaScore gave the film an average grade of "A−" on an A+ to F scale.

Roger Ebert gave the film two-and-a-half stars out of four and wrote, "You want loud, dumb, skillful, escapist entertainment? Twister works. You want to think? Think twice about seeing it". In her review for The New York Times, Janet Maslin wrote, "Somehow Twister stays as up-tempo and exuberant as a roller-coaster ride, neatly avoiding the idea of real danger". Entertainment Weekly gave the film a "B" rating, and Lisa Schwarzbaum wrote, "Yet the images that linger longest in my memory are those of windswept livestock. And that, in a teacup, sums up everything that's right, and wrong, about this appealingly noisy but ultimately flyaway first blockbuster of summer". In his review for the Los Angeles Times, Kenneth Turan wrote, "But the ringmaster of this circus, the man without whom nothing would be possible, is director De Bont, who now must be considered Hollywood's top action specialist. An expert in making audiences squirm and twist, at making us feel the rush of experience right along with the actors, De Bont choreographs action and suspense so beautifully he makes it seem like a snap." Time magazine's Richard Schickel wrote, "when action is never shown to have deadly or pitiable consequences, it tends toward abstraction. Pretty soon you're not tornado watching, you're special-effects watching". In his review for the Washington Post Desson Howe wrote, "it's a triumph of technology over storytelling and the actors' craft. Characters exist merely to tell a couple of jokes, cower in fear of downdrafts and otherwise kill time between tornadoes".

Awards

Release

Home media 
Twister was released on LaserDisc and VHS by Warner Home Video on October 1, 1996. The VHS release contains a Space Jam trailer, as well as a Looney Tunes cartoon with Bugs Bunny and Taz. As soon as the film finishes, there is a message by Federal Emergency Management Agency with James Lee Witt. By November 1996, it topped the number one spot in Billboards top sales. However, that spot was soon taken by Toy Story, which put Twister into third place. The film was released on DVD on March 26, 1997. It is considered to be the first home release of a movie to use this now widely-used optical media technology. This is also the first THX certified DVD release. The viewer is given the option of viewing the film in widescreen on one side of the disc and pan and scan full screen on the other side. The DVD release occurred eleven days before Twister made its pay-cable debut on HBO on April 5, deviating from the then-standard film release "window" that normally placed a four- to six-month gap between a movie's initial home video release—which typically overlapped with its pay-per-view availability period—and premium cable distribution window. Twister was then released on VHS by Universal Pictures Home Entertainment through CIC Video in the UK on March 10, 1997 and July 14, 1997.

The film was released on DVD once again on June 6, 2000. Special features on this release include an audio commentary by Jan De Bont and Stefen Fangmeier to listen throughout the film, behind-the-scenes footage and a Van Halen music video. Eight years later on May 6, 2008, a two-disc special edition DVD and Blu-ray were released. An HD DVD was then released on May 27, becoming one of the last HD DVDs to be ever released.

Legacy 
On May 24, 1996, a tornado destroyed Screen No. 3 at the Can-View Drive-In, a drive-in theater in Thorold, Ontario, which was scheduled to show Twister later that evening, in a real-life parallel to a scene in the film in which a tornado destroys a drive-in during a showing of the film The Shining. The facts of this incident were exaggerated into an urban legend that the theater was actually playing Twister during the tornado.

On May 10, 2010, a tornado struck Fairfax, Oklahoma, destroying the farmhouse where numerous scenes in Twister were shot. J. Berry Harrison, the owner of the home and a former Oklahoma state senator, commented that the tornado appeared eerily similar to the fictitious one in the film. He had lived in the home since 1978.

Bill Paxton later narrated storm chaser Sean Casey's 2011 documentary Tornado Alley. After the death of Paxton in February 2017, hundreds of storm chasers and users of the Spotter Network used their markers to spell out his initials across the states of Texas, Kansas, and Oklahoma in tribute to the actor, citing that the movie was the inspiration for many of them to pursue storm chasing and meteorology.

A Twister museum in Wakita, Oklahoma, where many of the particularly destructive scenes of the movie were shot, contains various memorabilia and artifacts related to the film.

On May 15, 2021, a 25th-anniversary party was held in Wakita. Many events included a car show, a "look like a star" contest, and several kids games. The lunch break included walking tacos at the Citizens by Community Health Center, sloppy joe sandwiches at Wakita Foodland, and hamburgers at the Gazebo. Several other snacks, such as beef jerky, cinnamon rolls, ice cream, popcorn, and snow cones, were served. A week later, the Rodeo Cinema in Oklahoma City played Twister on May 22 during the evening.

In other media

Pinball 

On April 3, 1996, Sega Pinball released Twister, a pinball machine themed to the film. It features modes including Canister Multiball, Chase Multiball, Multibull, and more.

Theme park attraction

The film was used as the basis for the attraction Twister...Ride It Out at Universal Studios Florida, which features filmed introductions by Bill Paxton and Helen Hunt. The attraction opened on May 4, 1998, and closed on November 1, 2015, to make way for Race Through New York Starring Jimmy Fallon. In the windows of the New York facade lies a tribute to Twister...Ride it Out with references to the film and Bill Paxton.

Book tie-in 
The original screenplay, written by Crichton and then-wife Anne Marie Martin, was released as a mass-market paperback in conjunction with the film.

Sequel 

In June 2020, a remake was announced to be in development from the original film's international distributor, Universal Pictures, with Joseph Kosinski in early negotiations to serve as director. Frank Marshall and Sara Scott were set to serve as producers on the project. In June 2021, Helen Hunt expressed interest in developing a sequel to the original film. The studio rejected Hunt's plans for writing and directing it, due to her character being killed off for the sequel. In October 2022, it was announced that the project will be repurposed into a legacy-sequel. 

Officially titled Twisters, the script was written by Mark L. Smith with a plot that revolves around Hunt's Dr. Joanne "Jo" Harding character, and the daughter that she had with Dr. William "Bill the Extreme" Harding (portrayed by Bill Paxton), who has also become a storm chaser like her parents. After Steven Spielberg read the script, his enthusiasm contributed to getting the project green-lit. The project will be a joint-venture production between Universal, Amblin, and Warner Bros. Pictures. Lee Isaac Chung was in talks to direct the film, with Marshall producing through The Kennedy/Marshall Company banner. In March 2023, Daisy Edgar-Jones joined the cast in the lead role.

Principal photography is scheduled to commence in May 2023. The film is set to be released on July 19, 2024.

See also 
 Night of the Twisters: A 1996 telemovie based on the 1984 novel of the same name by Ivy Ruckman
 Into the Storm: A film released in 2014, with a similar film plot to Twister.
 1999 Oklahoma tornado outbreak
 TOtable Tornado Observatory: A device used to monitor tornadoes in the 80's that was the inspiration for Dorothy 1-4.

References

External links 

 
 
 

1996 films
1996 drama films
1996 action thriller films
1990s disaster films
1990s road movies
Amblin Entertainment films
American action thriller films
American disaster films
American road movies
BAFTA winners (films)
Films about tornadoes
Films set in 1969
Films set in 1996
Films set in Oklahoma
Films shot in Iowa
Films shot in Kansas
Films shot in Oklahoma
Films directed by Jan de Bont
Films produced by Kathleen Kennedy
Films scored by Mark Mancina
Films with screenplays by Michael Crichton
Films with screenplays by Joss Whedon
Golden Raspberry Award winning films
Universal Pictures films
Warner Bros. films
Films produced by Ian Bryce
1990s English-language films
1990s American films